= Kalpana Shankar =

Kalpana Shankar is Professor of Information and Communication Studies at University College Dublin. In 2022 Shankar became one of the first women of colour to become a full professor in Ireland. She studies the use of data and information in the social sciences, open data, and data archives.

== Life ==
Shankar gained a Ph.D. in library and information science at University of California, Los Angeles, and stayed at UCLA as a postdoctoral researcher in the Center for Embedded Networked Sensing. She became an assistant professor at Indiana University-Bloomington's School of Informatics and Computing before joining the School of Information and Library Studies at UCD in July 2011.
